Maduravoyal is a taluk of the city district of Chennai in the Indian state of Tamil Nadu.

Maduravoyal may also refer to:
 Maduravoyal (state assembly constituency)
 Maduravoyal taluk
 Maduravoyal Junction